The Ballet Girl is a 1918 German silent comedy film directed by Ernst Lubitsch and starring Ossi Oswalda, Harry Liedtke and Margarete Kupfer.

It was shot at the Tempelhof Studios in Berlin. The film's sets were designed by the art director Kurt Richter.

Cast

References

Bibliography

External links

1918 films
Films of the German Empire
German silent feature films
Films directed by Ernst Lubitsch
German comedy films
1918 comedy films
UFA GmbH films
Films shot at Tempelhof Studios
German black-and-white films
Silent comedy films
1910s German films
1910s German-language films